Luz M. Santiago González (born November 8, 1957 in Yabucoa, Puerto Rico) is a Puerto Rican politician and Senator. Santiago has been a member of the Senate of Puerto Rico since 2008.

Early years and studies

Luz M. Santiago González was born on November 8, 1957 in Yabucoa, Puerto Rico. His parents are Angel M. Santiago and María E. González. Santiago studied in the public system of Puerto Rico, until her first year of high school. At that time, she continued studying at the University Preparatory Center (CROEM) in Mayagüez. She received his bachelor's degree in natural science from the University of Puerto Rico and then continued studies in education at the University of Turabo. She worked fourteen years for the Puerto Rico Department of Health.

Political career

In 2000, Santiago began her political career when she was elected as a municipal legislator for Yabucoa at the 2000 general elections. She then became the Speaker of her party in that body, until 2008.

In 2008, Santiago ran for senator for the District of Humacao and won his party primaries. At the 2008 general election, Santiago won along with José Ramón Díaz. She currently presides the Commission of Natural and Environmental Resources.

Personal life

Santiago González has three children: Wai Lok, Pusie, and Pukei.

References

External links
Hon. Luz Santiago González on SenadoPR

Members of the Senate of Puerto Rico
Living people
1957 births
New Progressive Party (Puerto Rico) politicians
People from Yabucoa, Puerto Rico
University of Puerto Rico alumni